Mandar Chandwadkar is an Indian actor. He is best known for playing the role of Aatmaram Tukaram Bhide in the Hindi sitcom Taarak Mehta Ka Ooltah Chashmah.

Personal life
Chandwadkar was born in Mumbai, Maharashtra and attended R.M. Bhatt High School in Parel, Mumbai. He graduated from the Guru Nanak Khalsa College of Arts, Science & Commerce, in Matunga Mumbai. He worked as a mechanical engineer in Dubai for three years(1997-2000). He left the job to pursue a career in acting. He is married to Snehal Chandwadkar, with whom he has a son named Parth.

Theatre
In 1998, Chandwadkar formed his own theatre groups called Pratibimb and performed in three Hindi / Marathi comedies. He has directed several one-act plays. He has been active in both Hindi and Marathi teleserials and has acted in over 30 of them.

Filmography

Films

Television

Awards

References

External links

1976 births
Male actors in Hindi television
Indian male voice actors
Indian male television actors
Living people